Spilopastes is a genus of moths within the Castniidae family, containing one species, Spilopastes galinthias which is known from Brazil.

References

Castniidae